Thallophaga hyperborea, the northern thallophaga, is a moth of the family Geometridae. The species was first described by George Duryea Hulst in 1900, and it can be found in the Canadian province of British Columbia.

The moths fly from April to May depending on the location.

The larvae feed on western hemlock, Douglas fir, red cedar and other firs. The moth is also recorded on willow and alder as well as other conifers.

Sources

"Thallophaga hyperborea (Hulst) on Insects and diseases of Canada's forests". Natural Resources Canada.

Lithinini
Taxa named by George Duryea Hulst
Moths described in 1900